La Lanterne magique is the title of a former French 19th-century weekly, published on Saturdays. The subtitle read: Reproductions of masterpieces of painting and literature.

It was first released 2 May 1857 and appeared up to issue #65 in August 1858. The editor was Adolphe Delahays, the engravings by Louis Paul Pierre Dumont.

Published works 
 Léon Beauvallet, À travers les deux mondes
 Jacques Amyot, Daphnis et Chloé
 C. Noël, Un amour de Goethe
 Elizabeth Inchbald, Simple histoire
 Henry de Kock, Le Roi des étudiants
 Spindler, Contes pour tous
 Alphonse de Lamartine, Graziella
 Auguste Maquet, La Maison du baigneur
 Kaufmann, Le Lantana des Batignolles

Sources
 Claude Witkowski. (1997). Les Éditions populaires 1848-1870, GIPPE, (p. 143)

1857 establishments in France
1858 disestablishments in France
Defunct literary magazines published in France
French-language magazines
Magazines established in 1857
Magazines disestablished in 1858
Weekly magazines published in France